Kehena Beach is a narrow black sand beach located on the east shore of the island of Hawaii, in the Puna district. Spinner dolphins frequent the water; as a result, the beach has also been known as Dolphin Beach.

Formation 
The beach was formed in a 1955 lava flow. There is a point of rocks on one end of the beach that marks where the flow ended.

Nudity 
Kehena Beach is listed on many websites and guide books as clothing-option. Though nudity at the beach has been documented, nude beaches are not legal in Hawaii and officers have written citations for nudity at Kehena beach.

References 

Beaches of Hawaii (island)
Nude beaches
Black sand beaches